The Monastery of the Angels is the cloistered convent of a Roman Catholic religious order for women in Karachi, Pakistan. The community is made up of nine Dominican sisters. They dedicate their lives to constant prayer with one of them always present in the chapel. They receive many letters, telephone calls, faxes and e-mail with prayer requests.

The mother superior of the monastery and her assistant read the newspapers to learn about the situation in the world. They then tell the other sisters about the important things happening outside the cloisters.

The sisters are separated from the outside world by a grate. This divides them from the guests who visit them, from the priest who celebrates Mass for them, and even from the relatives who come to visit them on certain days.

Daily life in the convent is similar to that in other cloisters throughout the world. The sisters typically make bread, cakes, sweets, hosts and wine for the parishes. These products are placed near a small opening where  people come to pick them up.

When Archbishop Joseph Cordeiro became archbishop of Karachi in 1958, he invited a community of contemplative nuns to the diocese. In December 1959, nine nuns from the monastery in Los Angeles arrived in Pakistan to found the monastery in Karachi. On July 20, 1968, the convent was moved from Ingle Road to its current location in the Landhi area of Karachi.

Fr. James deSouza was the first Chaplain of the Monastery. Later when he became the Rector of the St. Pius X Minor Seminary he used to send his young Seminarians to help the sisters whenever they had some difficult work like cleaning of the Retreat House, a special planting project in the garden, or other heavy jobs. The sisters in turn supplied them with home – made jam, bakery goods, and fruits and vegetables from their garden.

On December 20, 2009 the Monastery celebrated the 50th anniversary of its beginning in Pakistan. However, there had been no one joining their number in ten years. Archbishop Evarist Pinto of Karachi, celebrated a special Mass at the monastery chapel, concelebrated with Bishop Max John Rodrigues of Hyderabad, Karachi Vicar General Father Arthur Charles, and 17 other priests.

In 2013 all the sisters were Pakistani.

In 2016, there were ten professed nuns and two second year novices in the community.

Their bread
The nuns earn a modest income by baking and selling bread. It was described by Salman Rushdi as “white, crusty and full of flavour”.

External links
Monastery of the Angels Los Angeles website

References

Catholic Church in Pakistan
Dominican monasteries in Pakistan
Dominican nuns
Roman Catholic monasteries in Pakistan